John William Goff, also known as Bill Goff (1925–2009), was an American baseball player for the New York Giants during the 1950s, and a starting pitcher for the Giants for four years. He also served as a player and coach for the St. Louis Cardinals and Giants minor league organizations from 1943–1952. He batted left handed and his batting average was a .263. Throughout his career, he played as a pitcher and threw right handed.

Goff was involved in the development of the first professional women's softball organization, the ABA. In 2005, he was inducted into the St. Louis Amateur Baseball Hall of Fame.

Personal life
Goff had seven sons and four grandchildren. After retiring from a career in baseball, he worked as an executive in an insurance company. He died in Chesterfield, Missouri on September 13, 2009.

References

1925 births
2009 deaths
New York Giants (NL) players